The 27th Miss Chinese International Pageant, Miss Chinese International Pageant 2016 was held on January 23, 2016. Miss Chinese International 2015 Mandy Chai of Sydney, Australia crowned her successor, Jennifer Coosemans of Vancouver, British Columbia, Canada at the end of the pageant.

Pageant information
The slogan to this year's pageant was "The Soul of Eternal Beauty, Displaying the Features of a Thousand Colours" 「絕美靈魂 流露千色面貌」. Aside from the top 3 placements, Miss Friendship was also awarded. The masters of ceremony this year were Carol Cheng, Lawrence Cheng, and Luisa Maria Leitão.  There were two judging panels this year, the Diamond Judging Panel of six male actors and singers, and the Elegant Judging Panel, which consists of twenty past Miss Chinese International Pageant and Miss Hong Kong Pageant contestants.  Both judging panels selected the winner and runners-up of the pageant, however, after each round of competition, the top current top 3 rankings from the Elegant Judging Panel were revealed.

With 14 delegates competing, this marks the lowest contestant turnout in the history of the pageant.  Contestant number four, Sophia Wu was originally introduced as representing Jiangsu at the initial press conference, but was later changed to representing Nanjing in her profile on the official pageant website.  With Cooseman's win, she became Vancouver's seventh Miss Chinese International titleholder.

Judges

Diamond Judging Panel
Pakho Chau
Ruco Chan
Alex Fong
Alfred Hui
Lai Lok-yi
Sammy Sum

Elegant Judging Panel
Océane Zhu, Miss Chinese International 2008
Christine Kuo, Miss Chinese International 2009
Gloria Tang, Miss Chinese International 2013
Grace Chan, Miss Chinese International 2014; Miss Hong Kong 2013
Kayi Cheung, Miss Chinese International Pageant 2008 First Runner-Up; Miss Hong Kong 2007
Veronica Shiu, Miss Chinese International Pageant 2015 First Runner-Up; Miss Hong Kong 2014
Carat Cheung, Miss Chinese International Pageant 2013 Second Runner-Up; Miss Hong Kong 2012
Janet Chow, Miss Hong Kong Pageant 2006 First Runner-Up
Jacqueline Wong, Miss Hong Kong Pageant 2012 First Runner-Up
Sisley Choi, Miss Hong Kong Pageant 2013 First Runner-Up
Erin Wong, Miss Hong Kong Pageant 2014 First Runner-Up
Lisa Ch'ng, Miss Hong Kong Pageant 2010 Second Runner-Up
Whitney Hui, Miss Hong Kong Pageant 2011 Second Runner-Up
Tracy Chu, Miss Hong Kong Pageant 2012 Second Runner-Up
Katherine Ho, Miss Hong Kong Pageant 2014 Second Runner-Up
Mayanne Mak, Miss Hong Kong Pageant 2011 Third Runner-Up
Jennifer Shum, Miss Hong Kong Pageant 2012 Miss Photogenic
Samantha Ko, Miss Hong Kong Pageant 2008 Tourism Ambassador Award winner
Roxanne Tong, Miss Hong Kong Pageant 2012 Tourism Ambassador Award winner
Pheobe Pang, Miss Hong Kong Pageant 2010 Top 8 Finalist

Results

Special awards

Contestant list

References

External links
 Miss Chinese International Pageant 2016 Official Site

TVB
2016 beauty pageants
Beauty pageants in Hong Kong
Miss Chinese International Pageants
2016 in Hong Kong